The Ikarus 214 was a military aircraft produced in Yugoslavia in the early 1950s. Originally intended as a light reconnaissance-bomber, it was produced as a trainer and transport aircraft when the testing of the prototype showed it had insufficient performance for the reconnaissance-bomber role.

Development
A conventional, low-wing cantilever monoplane with twin tail, the Ikarus 214 was designed by Professor constructor Simo Milutinovic, and first flew on 7 August 1949. The aircraft was of wooden construction, twin-engined, with a crew of two to four depending on the mission/role of the aircraft. The main landing gear wheels retracted into the engine nacelles of the two Ranger SVG-770C-B1 inverted V-12 piston engines. Serial production aircraft were powered by 2x Pratt & Whitney R-1340AN-1 radial engines.

Unlike production aircraft, the first prototype had fixed landing gear, due to delays in development of the retractable undercarriage. On the first test flight one engine failed, the pilot, Lieutenant Nikola Simic, attempted to return to the airport at Zemun, but the aircraft lost altitude and crashed near the Ikarus factory, killing the pilot. Analysis concluded that the accident was caused by a combination of failure of the propeller feathering mechanism, high drag to the landing gear, small fin area, asymmetric thrust and limited engine power.

The second prototype with the same engines, retractable landing gear and increased vertical tail surfaces flew in 1951. This aircraft was used, after flight test was completed, by the JRV until 10 October 1957. The revised version for  photo-reconnaissance, designated Ikarus 214F, flew until 1959 when it was written off after an accident.

Operational history
A total of 22 aircraft, two prototypes and series production of only 20 meant the Ikarus 214 was not widely used, flight testing having revealed that the 214 could not meet the requirements of a light twin-engine bomber.

The  Ikarus 214AS trainer was mainly used as a crew trainer for bomber pilots and navigators.

The Ikarus 214D transport variant of the aircraft could carry up to 8 passengers or parachutists.

Naval reconnaissance versions were limited, by a lack of suitable equipment, to mission in daylight and good weather conditions.

Two aircraft were equipped to carry out maritime reconnaissance and anti-submarine warfare as the Ikarus 214PP, and Ikarus 214AM2.

All Ikarus 214 aircraft were withdrawn from military service by 1967.

Six aircraft were donated to the Aeronautical Union of Yugoslavia, continuing to fly in aero-clubs at Ljubljana, Zagreb, Novi Sad, Vrsac, Skopje and Sarajevo, for transport and parachute jumps. All civilian 214s were withdrawn from service during the 1970s.

Although not entirely successful in its intended role the Ikarus 214 gained a good reputation from parachute jumpers at the aero-clubs.

Survivors
A single Ikarus 214 has been preserved at the Museum of Aviation at Belgrade Airport.

Variants
Ikarus 214prototype with Ranger SVG-770C-B1 inline engines,
Ikarus 214Dwith Pratt & Whitney R-1340-AN-1 radial engines,
Ikarus 214AStraining aircraft,
Ikarus 214Freconnaissance aircraft for photoreconnaissance,
Ikarus 214PPanti-submarine aircraft,
Ikarus 214АМ2improved version of the anti-submarine aircraft.

Operators

Yugoslav Air Force
570th Anti-Submarine Aviation Squadron (1961-1964)
571st Anti-Submarine Aviation Squadron (1961-1964)
679th Transport Aviation Squadron (1961-1966)

Specifications

See also
Sima Milutinović

References
 
 Уголок неба (Ugolok Neba) 
 Бојан Б. Димитријевић "Југословенско ратно ваздухопловство 1942.-1992." 
 Жутић. Н. и Бошковић. Л., Икарус - Икарбус: 1923 - 1998,(Монографија 75 година Икаруса), Икарбус, Београд, 1999. 
 Златко Рендулић, Авиони домаће конструкције после Другог светског рата, Лола институт, Београд, 1996. год.

External links

 Ikarus 214 
 Photos at Уголок неба
 www.ikarbas.rs
 www.mysity-military.com/Avijacija-i-PVO/Licna-karta-Ikarus-214.html
 www.aeroklub-sarajevo.ba/911.htm 
 www.muzejrv.mod.gov.rs/pages_files/expo_files/motori.html
 www.aeroflight.co.uk/waf/yugo/af2/types/ikarus.htm

1940s Yugoslav military trainer aircraft
Ikarus aircraft
Low-wing aircraft
Twin piston-engined tractor aircraft
Aircraft first flown in 1949